Juan Román may refer to:
Juan Grande Román (1546-1600), Spanish Roman Catholic Saint
Juan Antonio Román (born 1943), Spanish football manager and former footballer
Juan José Roman (born 1962), Spanish sprint canoeist
Juan Román Riquelme (born 1978), Argentine footballer
Cabo Juan Román Airfield, Chilean airport

See also
Joan Román (born 1993), Spanish footballer